This is a list of named craters on Mercury, the innermost planet of the Solar System (for other features, see list of geological features on Mercury). Most Mercurian craters are named after famous writers, artists and composers. According to the rules by IAU's Working Group for Planetary System Nomenclature, all new craters must be named after an artist that was famous for more than fifty years, and dead for more than three years, before the date they are named. Craters larger than 250 km in diameter are referred to as "basins" (also see ).

As of 2021, there are 414 named Mercurian craters, a small fraction of the total number of named Solar System craters, most of which are lunar, Martian and Venerian craters.

Other, non-planetary bodies with numerous named craters include Callisto (141), Ganymede (131), Rhea (128), Vesta (90), Ceres (90), Dione (73), Iapetus (58), Enceladus (53), Tethys (50) and Europa (41). For a full list, see List of craters in the Solar System.

A 

back to top

B 

back to top

C 

back to top

D 

back to top

E 

back to top

F 

back to top

G 

back to top

H 

back to top

I 

back to top

J 

back to top

K 

back to top

L 

back to top

M 

back to top

N 

back to top

O 

back to top

P 

back to top

Q 

back to top

R 

back to top

S 

back to top

T 

back to top

U 

back to top

V 

back to top

W 

back to top

X 

back to top

Y 

back to top

Z 

back to top

Terminology 

As on the Moon and Mars, sequences of craters and basins of differing relative ages provide the best means of establishing stratigraphic order on Mercury. Overlap relations among many large mercurian craters and basins are clearer than those on the Moon. Therefore, as this map shows, we can build up many local stratigraphic columns involving both crater or basin materials and nearby plains materials.

Over all of Mercury, the crispness of crater rims and the morphology of their walls, central peaks, ejecta deposits, and secondary-crater fields have undergone systematic changes with time. The youngest craters or basins in a local stratigraphic sequence have the sharpest, crispest appearance. The oldest craters consist only of shallow depressions with slightly raised, rounded rims, some incomplete. On this basis, five age categories of craters and basins have been mapped; the characteristics of each are listed in the explanation. In addition, secondary crater fields are preserved around proportionally far more craters and basins on Mercury than on the Moon or Mars, and are particularly useful in determining overlap relations and degree of modification.

Because only limited photographic evidence was available from Mariner 10s three flybys of the planet, these divisions are often tentative. The five crater groups, from youngest to oldest, are:
 c5: Fresh-appearing, sharp-rimmed, rayed craters. Highest albedo in map area; haloes and rays may extend many crater diameters from rim crests. Superposed on all other map units. Generally smaller and fewer than older craters.
 c4: Fresh but slightly modified craters—Similar in morphology to c5 craters but without bright haloes or rays; sharp rim crests; continuous ejecta blankets; very few superposed secondary craters. Floors consist of crater or smooth plains materials.
 c3: Modified craters—Rim crest continuous but slightly rounded and subdued. Ejecta blanket generally less extensive than those of younger craters of similar size. Superposed craters and rays common; smooth plains and intermediate plains materials cover floors of many craters. Central peaks more common than in c4 craters, probably because of larger average size of c3 craters.
 c2: Subdued craters—Low-rimmed, relatively shallow craters, many with discontinuous rim crests. Floors covered by smooth plains and intermediate plains materials. Crater density of ejecta blankets similar to that of intermediate plains material.
 c1 Degraded craters—Similar to c2 crater material but more deteriorated; many superposed craters.

See also
 List of geological features on Mercury
 List of quadrangles on Mercury

Note

References 
 
 Batson R.M., Russell J.F. (1994), Gazetteer of Planetary Nomenclature, United States Geological Survey Bulletin 2129 
 Davies M.E., Dwornik S.E., Gault D.E., Strom R.G. (1978), Atlas of Mercury, NASA Scientific and Technical Information Office

External links
 USGS: Mercury nomenclature
 USGS: Mercury Nomenclature: Craters
 Atlas of Mercury

Mercury
Mercury (planet)-related lists

sv:Lista över geologiska strukturer på Merkurius#Kratrar